Tier may refer to:

Groupings 
Organizational, a ranking relationship involving order in a collective and its subordinate components
Ranking, a relationship involving order between a set of observations or variables
Data center tiers, Telecommunications Infrastructure Standard for Data Centers, which defines a level in terms of "tiers"
Multitiered or multilayered,  a tier based system in software architecture
Tier (emission standard), rankings of emission standards in the US
Standings or rankings are listings which compare sports teams or individuals, institutions, nations, companies, or other entities by ranking them in order of ability or achievement
Tier list, a list of playable characters ranked by their abilities in competitive settings
Tiers of suppliers in a supply chain

Other
 A row of moorings or anchorages for ships
A variant of the surname Thiers
Taiwan Institute of Economic Research, one of two major economic research institutes in Taiwan
"Tier" (song), by German band Rammstein
A fictional character in Marvel Comics; son of Hrimhari and Wolfsbane
TIER Mobility, a shared e-scooter operator company from Germany

See also
 Tier 1 (disambiguation)
 Tier 2 (disambiguation)
 Tier 3 (disambiguation)
 Tier 4 (disambiguation)
 Northern Tier (disambiguation)
 Tiers (disambiguation)